The Aspen Fire burned from June 17, 2003, for about a month on Mount Lemmon, part of the Santa Catalina Mountains located in the Coronado National Forest north of Tucson, Arizona, and in the surrounding area. It burned  (132.4 sq mi) of land, and destroyed 340 homes and businesses of the town of Summerhaven.

Damages to electric lines, phone lines, water facilities, streets and sewers totaled $4.1 million. Firefighting cost was about $17 million, and the Forest Service is spending $2.7 million to prevent soil loss.

In 2002, the year before the fire started, Congress had been requested to allocate about $2 million to cover the implementation of fire prevention measures in the Coronado National Forest. However, that allocation was reduced to about $150,000 in the Congressional budget process.

References

 Barnes, Mary Ellen. Forged by Fire: The Devastation and Renewal of a Mountain Community.  [Tucson, AZ]: Vireo House, 2005.

External links
 Arizona Daily Star article covering the event
 Pima County Aspen Fire Recovery site
 Aspen Fire Department

Santa Catalina Mountains
History of Pima County, Arizona
Wildfires in Arizona
2003 in Arizona
2003 wildfires in the United States
Wildfires in Pima County, Arizona